Kevin Coye (born July 19, 1975) is a retired American soccer defender who played professionally in the USISL.

Growing up, Coye played his club soccer with the North Huntington Beach Futbol Club.  In 1993, he graduated from Ocean View High School.  He attended UCLA, playing on the men’s soccer team from 1994 to 1997.  Coye and his teammates won the 1997 NCAA Division I Men's Soccer Championship.  In February 1998, the New England Revolution selected Coye in the third round (twenty-ninth overall) of the 1998 MLS College Draft.  The Revolution sent him on loan to both MLS Pro 40 and the Worcester Wildfire before waiving him on June 6, 1998.  In July, Coye played for the Boston Bulldogs.
In August 1998, Coye joined the Orange County Zodiac.  In 1999, Coye began the season with the Cape Cod Crusaders and finished it with the Boston Bulldogs.

Kevin is a huge Howard Stern fan and has a crush on Ronnie the Limo Driver.  His brother-in-law is a wine executive,  who Kevin has been quoted as saying, “He’s my guiding light and my moral compass!”

References

External links
 

Living people
1976 births
American soccer players
Boston Bulldogs (soccer) players
Cape Cod Crusaders players
New England Revolution players
Orange County Blue Star players
UCLA Bruins men's soccer players
Worcester Wildfire players
MLS Pro-40 players
A-League (1995–2004) players
New England Revolution draft picks
Association football defenders